Ciro Immobile  (born 20 February 1990) is an Italian professional footballer who plays as a forward for Serie A club Lazio, which he captains, and the Italy national team.

Immobile began his career at Sorrento. In 2009, he was purchased by Juventus, and was later loaned out to three Serie B clubs, including Pescara, with whom he won the league title as the top scorer, before moving to Genoa in 2012. After a season with the club, he moved to Juventus' rivals Torino. At Torino, he won the Capocannoniere award for the top scorer in Serie A. After his breakout season at Torino, he was sold to German club Borussia Dortmund for around €18 million in 2014, where they won the DFL-Supercup, before moving to Spanish club Sevilla in 2015. In 2016, he returned to Torino on loan, and was later sold to Lazio in July of that year. In his second season at Lazio, he won the Capocannoniere for a second time, with 29 goals in 33 games. The 2019–20 season was the most prolific of Immobile's career; he equalled the record for most Serie A goals in a season with 36, and won a third Capocannoniere title and first European Golden Shoe, given to the top scorer in Europe. Immobile has also won a Coppa Italia and two Supercoppa Italiana titles with Lazio. He is currently Lazio's all-time highest goalscorer. In 2022, he won the Capocannoniere for a fourth time, with 27 goals in 31 games.

Immobile made his debut for the Italy national team in 2014, and was included in the squad for the 2014 FIFA World Cup and two UEFA European Championships (2016 and 2020) winning the latter tournament.

Club career

Sorrento and Juventus
Born in Torre Annunziata, in the province of Naples, Immobile began his youth career in the football school "Torre Annunziata '88", before transferring to "Maria Rosa" and finally the youth team of Salernitana, where however, he failed to emerge. He later joined Sorrento, with whom he scored 30 goals in the under-17 during the 2007–08 season, including a brace against Torino, impressing the observers of Juventus.

In 2008, he was signed at the age of 18 for €80,000 by Juventus under the recommendation of Ciro Ferrara. He went on to play with the Primavera formation.

Immobile joined the Primavera squad in 2009, where he formed a striking partnership with Ayub Daud, that led the squad to win the 2009 Torneo di Viareggio, where he scored a total five goals; two of which came in the final.

On 14 March 2009, Immobile made his Serie A debut in a 4–1 home win against Bologna, replacing Juventus' captain Alessandro Del Piero in the 89th minute.
On 25 November 2009, Immobile also made his debut in a European competition, once again as a second-half substitute for Del Piero in a Champions League game against Bordeaux. In February 2010, he scored a hat-trick against Empoli in the 2010 Torneo di Viareggio final to seal the title for a second consecutive season.

Loans to Siena and Grosseto
On 1 July 2010, Immobile, along with teammate Luca Marrone, were sent on loan to recently relegated Serie B side A.C. Siena. In exchange for the two loans, Juventus acquired Niccolò Giannetti, Leonardo Spinazzola, and Austrian midfielder Marcel Büchel on loan from the Tuscan club. Immobile never broke into the first team, however, and in January 2011, he left Siena, after just 4 appearances and 1 goal. Following his departure from Siena, he was immediately loaned by Juventus to Grosseto, another Serie B club for the remainder of the 2010–11 Serie B season.

Loan to Pescara
On 17 August 2011, it was announced that Immobile would join Serie B club Pescara on a season-long loan from Juventus. He scored his first goal for the club on 26 August during his debut for Pescara in the first league match against Hellas Verona. By the end of the 2011–12 Serie B andata (first half of the season), Immobile had already scored 14 league goals. On 30 January 2012, Genoa confirmed that they had paid €4 million for half of the player's rights from Juventus, following his mercurial form in Serie B. He completed his season with Pescara in the Italian second division, as the club won the league title and sealed promotion to Serie A. He also went on to become the Serie B season's top scorer with a total of 28 goals, seven more than the second-highest scorer, Juve Stabia's Marco Sau. Immobile was also named Serie B's Player of the Year at the 2012 AIC Gran Gala del Calcio, alongside teammates Lorenzo Insigne and Marco Verratti.

Genoa
Immobile formally became a Genoa player on 1 July 2012 after the loan with Pescara expired. On 19 June 2013, Genoa and Juventus again renewed the co-ownership agreements of Immobile and Boakye.

Torino
On 12 July 2013 Juventus bought Genoa's half of Immobile for €2.75 million. On the same day he was sold to city-rivals Torino under a new co-ownership deal for €2.75 million.

He made his debut for Torino during the first round of the Coppa Italia against former club Pescara, scoring his first goal of the season. He provided an assist in his Serie A debut for the club, but did not score until 7 October in a 2–2 draw against Sampdoria. Previously, Immobile had failed to score in Serie A since December 2012. The goal signalled a run of form for Immobile, with the player scoring a further 12 goals in his next 15 matches, including his first brace in Serie A during a game against Chievo Verona in December.

On 22 March 2014, Immobile scored his first Serie A hat-trick, in a 3–1 win against Livorno. Three days later, he scored a spectacular volley with his left foot against Roma, temporarily bringing the Granata level at the Stadio Olimpico. On 6 April, he scored the winning goal against Catania in a 2–1 victory.

On 13 April, Genoa were leading 1–0, when Immobile and Alessio Cerci both scored in stoppage time to give Torino a 2–1 win. He scored again in the following round in a 3–3 draw away to Lazio. On 27 April, Immobile scored for the sixth consecutive match in a 2–0 defeat of Udinese. This took him to 21 goals in the season, equaling the seasonal goal records of Paolo Pulici and Francesco Graziani at Torino.

On 11 May, Immobile scored in the penultimate fixture of the season against Parma, but was sent off in the second half and suspended for the final match against Fiorentina. He concluded his season with 22 goals in 33 appearances, plus one goal in the Coppa Italia. He became the first Torino player to win the Capocannoniere since Francesco Graziani in the 1976–77 season.

Borussia Dortmund

On 2 June 2014 Bundesliga club Borussia Dortmund announced the signing of Immobile, despite the co-ownership agreement between Torino and Juventus not being resolved. Urbano Cairo, the president of Torino, accused Juventus and Dortmund of violating FIFA regulation regarding transfer on 10 May 2014, which FIGC also states that such transfers must have mutual consent of the co-owners. Cairo also wanted to keep Immobile for at least a season for sports and for profit. On 18 June 2014, Juventus sold the remaining 50% registration rights of Immobile to Torino for €8.035 million. Torino later revealed in its financial filing, that the transfer fee to the German side was €17.955 million. On 13 August 2014, Immobile made his official debut for Dortmund as a striker in the starting line up for the 2014 DFL-Supercup against Bayern Munich. The match ended in Borussia lifting the cup by the score of 2–0.

Immobile made his Bundesliga debut on 23 August in the opening match of Dortmund's 2014–15 Bundesliga campaign which saw them lose 2–0 to Bayer Leverkusen at home. On 16 September 2014, Immobile scored his first goal for the club, opening a 2–0 home win over Arsenal in the group stages of the Champions League.
He scored four goals in six Champions League matches, in a 3–0 away win over Anderlecht, in a 4–1 home win over Galatasaray and in a 1–1 home draw vs Anderlecht, with Borussia qualifying as first from the group. On 17 December 2014, Immobile assisted the first goal and scored the second on a 2–2 home draw with Wolfsburg.

Sevilla

On 12 July 2015, Immobile joined Sevilla on a season-long loan after scoring just three goals in the league in his first season at Borussia Dortmund, with a total 10 goals in 34 matches across all competitions. Sevilla also had an option to sign him outright. He made his debut for the club on 11 August 2015, coming off the bench to replace Kevin Gameiro in the 80th minute of the 2015 UEFA Super Cup final, against Barcelona, and assisting Yevhen Konoplyanka's temporary equaliser to send the match into extra-time; Barcelona went on to win the match 5–4.

On 31 July 2015, Immobile was stretchered off the pitch wearing an oxygen mask and a neck brace after playing just five minutes in a friendly against Watford at Vicarage Road after clashing heads with an opponent. He was taken to the hospital for tests and was in recovering condition. It was later determined his nasal septum ruptured, which looked like a major injury, but turned out to be only minor. On 8 November 2015, Immobile scored his first goal for Sevilla in the 36th minute as they emerged victorious in a 3–2 La Liga home win over Real Madrid. In November, the obligation to buy clause was exercised when Immobile made his fifth appearance, buying him outright for €11 million plus the €3 million for the loan spell.

Loan to Torino
On 14 January 2016, Immobile returned to Torino on loan until the end of 2015–16 season. Two days later on his return debut, he scored the opening goal of a 4–2 home victory over Frosinone. On 14 February, he scored a brace, in a 3–1 win away against Palermo. On 22 March, it was determined he sustained a muscular injury at the half time mark in a derby with Juventus two days prior, and would be sidelined for a month.

Lazio
On 27 July 2016, Immobile signed with Lazio for a fee of €8.75 million (plus €700,000 commission to agents). On 21 August, Immobile scored on his debut in Lazio's opening match of a 4–3 away win over Atalanta. Immobile finished the season with 23 league goals in 36 appearances plus 3 goals in the Coppa Italia, surpassing his total when he won the Capocannoniere with Torino in the 2013–14 season, though this time he did not win the Capocannoniere, losing it to Bosnian striker Edin Džeko of cross-town rivals Roma, who scored 29 league goals.

On 13 August 2017, Immobile scored the opening two goals of the Supercoppa Italiana; Lazio won with a final score of 3–2 over Juventus. On 10 September, in Lazio's third match of the season, he scored a hat-trick and got an assist in a 4–1 home win over Milan. On 21 October, Immobile extended with Lazio until 2022. On 6 January 2018, Immobile scored four goals in the first half away to SPAL, the first Lazio player to score multiple hat-tricks in a season in 16 years; Lazio eventually won the match 5–2. On 22 February 2018, Immobile scored a hat-trick in the Europa League round of 32 second leg home to Steaua București in a 5–1 win, which allowed Lazio to qualify, 5–2 on aggregate, to the round of 16. On 31 March 2018, Immobile scored twice in Lazio's 6–2 home win over Benevento, his 36th goal of the season, breaking Giorgio Chinaglia's previous record for most goals scored by a Lazio player in a single season, by two goals. Immobile ended the season with 29 goals in 33 appearances, winning the Capocannoniere jointly with Inter's Mauro Icardi.

On 3 November 2019, he scored his 100th goal for Lazio in a 2–1 away win over Milan. On 26 July 2020, Immobile scored a hat-trick in a 5–1 win against Hellas Verona. Immobile finished the season with 36 goals, winning the Capocannoniere and equaling Gino Rossetti and Gonzalo Higuaín's all-time record for most goals in a Serie A season. He also won the European Golden Shoe for the first time in his career, becoming the first Italian player or player from Serie A to win the award since Francesco Totti in 2007. Moreover, he set a new record for most penalties scored in a single Serie A season, with 14.

On 31 August 2020, Immobile signed a five-year contract extension with Lazio. On 20 October 2020, he scored a goal in a 3–1 win over his former club Borussia Dortmund in the 2020–21 UEFA Champions League. On 12 May 2021, Immobile scored the only goal of a 1–0 home win over Parma in Serie A; this was his 150th goal for Lazio across all competitions.

On 30 October 2021, the Italian striker netted his 159th career goal for the Biancocelesti in a 2–1 win victory over Atalanta, drawing level with Silvio Piola’s all-time club goal record. On 4 November 2021, Immobile scored against Marseille in the UEFA Europa League to become Lazio's all-time leading goalscorer, surpassing Silvio Piola, with 160. With this goal, the Italian striker also became the club's all-time top scorer in the Europa League (11); he surpassed former striker Pierluigi Casiraghi, who had scored 10 times in the competition for Lazio. On 7 November 2021 against Salernitana (3-0 victory), Immobile became the first Lazio player to score 10+ goals in six consecutive Serie A seasons. On 6 January 2022 against Empoli (3-3 draw), Immobile became just the fourth player in Serie A history to score 15 goals in the league in seven separate seasons. On 5 March 2022 against Cagliari (3-0 victory), Immobile made his 200th appearance for Lazio in Serie A. In addition, with his goal against the Rossoblu, he matched Silvio Piola's goal record with Lazio in Serie A (143) and became the third player to ever score 20 or more Serie A goals in six different seasons. On 16 April 2022 against Torino (1-1 draw), Immobile scored his 180th Serie A goal, matching Sampdoria veteran Fabio Quagliarella at 13th in the league's all-time top scorers list. In addition, he became the first Italian player in Serie A history to score at least 25 goals in three separate league campaigns and reached 30+ goals in all competitions for a third time in his career. On 24 April 2022 against Milan (2-1 defeat), Immobile scored to become just the fourth player in Europe's top five leagues to score more than 25 goals in a league season at least three times since the 2016–17 season, joining Robert Lewandowski, Lionel Messi, and Cristiano Ronaldo.
On 19 February 2023, Immobile scored two goals against Salernitana (0-2 win), reaching at 8th in the league's all-time goalscorers.

International career

On 2 March 2014, he received his first call-up to the senior national team by Cesare Prandelli, for a friendly match against Spain three days later. He made his debut as a substitute for Alessio Cerci after 69 minutes as Spain eventually won 1–0.

On 13 May 2014, Immobile was named in Italy's provisional 30-man squad for the 2014 FIFA World Cup, and on 1 June he was named in the final 23-man squad. On 8 June, he scored a hat-trick in Italy's final World Cup warm-up match, a 5–3 unofficial win over Brazilian club side Fluminense. Immobile made his competitive debut in Italy's opening 2–1 win over England in Manaus on 14 June, playing the last 17 minutes in place of Mario Balotelli who scored the Italian winner. He scored his first official international goal in the third minute of a 2–0 friendly victory against the Netherlands on 4 September 2014.

On 31 May 2016, Immobile was named to Antonio Conte's 23-man Italy squad for UEFA Euro 2016.

In June 2021, he was included in Italy's squad for UEFA Euro 2020 by manager Roberto Mancini. In the opening match of the tournament on 11 June, he scored Italy's second goal and assisted Insigne for his team's final goal in a 3–0 win over Turkey. In the following group match on 16 June, he scored Italy's third goal in a 3–0 win over Switzerland. In the semi-final against Spain on 6 July, he assisted the opening goal scored in the second half by Federico Chiesa, of a 1–1 draw, before being substituted by Domenico Berardi; after extra-time, Italy advanced to the final of the tournament following a 4–2 penalty shoot-out victory. On 11 July, Immobile won the European Championship with Italy following a 3–2 penalty shoot-out victory over England at Wembley Stadium in the final, after a 1–1 draw in extra-time; Immobile started the match, but was once again replaced by Berardi during the second half of regulation time. After the game during celebration, Immobile gained notoriety when he slid on the pitch with his team and his pants fell down, which revealed his underpants.

Style of play
Although primarily a main striker, Immobile is capable of playing anywhere along the front-line. A quick forward, Immobile is primarily known for his offensive movement off the ball, as well as his ability to make attacking runs and exploit spaces. He will often drift wide, from a central position, when making forward runs, allowing him to ghost in behind the defensive line where he can cut in to shoot, usually into the far post. His main characteristics are his eye for goal and finishing ability with either foot, as well as his physical attributes; he also possesses solid technique, and is effective in the air. In addition to his offensive capabilities and goalscoring ability, he is also a hard-working player, known for his willingness to chase down the ball and press opponents when not in possession; he also possesses good link-up play, which enables him to provide assists for teammates, in addition to scoring goals himself. He is also an accurate penalty taker. His goalscoring record and efficiency has earned him the nickname "King Ciro" with the Lazio supporters.

Personal life 
In May 2014, Immobile and his long-time girlfriend Jessica Melena married. They have three children.

Career statistics

Club

International

Scores and results list Italy's goal tally first, score column indicates score after each Immobile goal.

Honours
Juventus Youth
 Torneo di Viareggio: 2009, 2010

Pescara
 Serie B: 2011–12

Borussia Dortmund
 DFL-Supercup: 2014

Lazio
 Coppa Italia: 2018–19
 Supercoppa Italiana: 2017, 2019

Italy
UEFA European Championship: 2020

Individual
 Torneo di Viareggio top scorer: 2010 (10 goals)
 Torneo di Viareggio best player: 2010
 Serie B Footballer of the Year: 2012
 Serie B top scorer: 2011–12 (28 goals)
 Capocannoniere: 2013–14 (22 goals), 2017–18 (joint – 29 goals), 2019–20 (36 goals), 2021–22 (27 goals)
 Serie A Team of the Year: 2013–14, 2017–18, 2019–20, 2021–22
UEFA Europa League top scorer: 2017–18 (joint – 8 goals)
UEFA Europa League Squad of the Season: 2017–18
 Serie A Player of the Month: October 2019
 European Golden Shoe: 2019–20
 Serie A Best Forward: 2019–20, 2021–22
 Lazio Player of the Season: 2019–20
 Italian Sportsman of the Year: 2020

Orders
 5th Class / Knight: Cavaliere Ordine al Merito della Repubblica Italiana: 2021

References

External links

 
 
 Ciro Immobile at TBPlayers
 Ciro Immobile at FICG.it 

1990 births
Living people
People from Torre Annunziata
Italian footballers
Footballers from Campania
Italy youth international footballers
Italy under-21 international footballers
Italy international footballers
Association football forwards
Juventus F.C. players
A.C.N. Siena 1904 players
F.C. Grosseto S.S.D. players
Delfino Pescara 1936 players
Genoa C.F.C. players
Torino F.C. players
Borussia Dortmund players
Sevilla FC players
S.S. Lazio players
Serie A players
Serie B players
Bundesliga players
La Liga players
Competitors at the 2009 Mediterranean Games
2014 FIFA World Cup players
UEFA Euro 2016 players
UEFA Euro 2020 players
Mediterranean Games silver medalists for Italy
Mediterranean Games medalists in football
Italian expatriate footballers
Expatriate footballers in Germany
Expatriate footballers in Spain
Italian expatriate sportspeople in Germany
Italian expatriate sportspeople in Spain
UEFA European Championship-winning players
Knights of the Order of Merit of the Italian Republic